Switzerland competed at the 1980 Summer Olympics in Moscow, USSR.  In partial support of the American-led 1980 Summer Olympics boycott, Switzerland competed under the Olympic Flag instead of its national flag. 73 competitors, 67 men and 6 women, took part in 45 events in 10 sports.

Medalists

Gold
Robert Dill-Bundi — Cycling, Men's 4.000m Individual Pursuit
Jürg Röthlisberger — Judo, Men's Middleweight (86 kg)

Archery

After not competing in the 1976 archery competition, Switzerland returned in 1980 with four competitors. Lotti Tschanz earned the nation's first top eight finish.

Women's Individual Competition:
Lotti Tschanz — 2346 points (→ 8th place)
Erika Ulrich — 2240 points (→ 18th place)

Men's Individual Competition:
Romeo Frigo — 2364 points (→ 18th place)
Patrick Jopp — 2190 points (→ 32nd place)

Athletics

Men's 1,500 metres
Pierre Délèze
 Heat — 3:44.8 (→ did not advance)

Men's 5,000 metres
 Markus Ryffel
 Heat — 13:45.0
 Semi Final — 13:29.3
 Final — 13:23.1 (→ 5th place)

Men's 10,000 metres
Markus Ryffel 
 Heat — did not finish (→ did not advance)

Men's Marathon
 Josef Peter
 Final — 2:24:53 (→ 40th place)

Men's 4×400 metres Relay
 Rolf Strittmatter, Peter Haas, Rolf Gisler, and Urs Kamber
 Heat — 3:07.2 (→ did not advance)

Men's 400 m Hurdles
 Franz Meier
 Heat — 50.32
 Semifinals — 50.12
 Final — 50.00 (→ 7th place)

Men's Long Jump
 Rolf Bernhard
 Qualification — 7.98 m
 Final — 7.88 m (→ 9th place)

Men's High Jump
 Roland Dalhäuser
 Qualification — 2.21 m
 Final — 2.24 m (→ 5th place)

Men's Pole Vault
 Felix Böhni
 Qualification — 5.15 m (→ did not advance)

Men's Shot Put
Jean-Pierre Egger
 Qualification — 19.61 m
 Final — 18.90 m (→ 12th place)

Men's Decathlon
 Stephan Niklaus
 Final — 7762 points (→ 12th place)

Women's 100 metres
 Brigitte Senglaub
 Heat — 11.69
 Quarterfinals — 11.56 (→ did not advance)

 Mosi Alli
 Heat — 12.19 (→ did not advance)

Women's 1,500 metres
 Cornelia Bürki
 Heat — 4:05.5 (→ did not advance)

Women's 100 m Hurdles
Yvonne Von Kauffungen 
 Heat — did not start (→ did not advance)

Canoeing

Cycling

Ten cyclists represented Switzerland in 1980. Robert Dill-Bundi won gold in the individual pursuit.

Individual road race
 Gilbert Glaus
 Richard Trinkler
 Hubert Seiz
 Jürg Luchs

Team time trial
 Gilbert Glaus
 Fritz Joost
 Jürg Luchs
 Richard Trinkler

Sprint
 Heinz Isler

1000m time trial
 Heinz Isler

Individual pursuit
 Robert Dill-Bundi

Team pursuit
 Robert Dill-Bundi
 Urs Freuler
 Hans Känel
 Hans Ledermann

Handball

Men's Team Competition
Preliminary Round (Group B)
 Lost to Soviet Union (15-22)
 Lost to Yugoslavia (21-26)
 Defeated Kuwait (32-14)
 Defeated Algeria (26-18)
 Lost to Romania (16-18)
Classification Match
 7th/8th place: Lost to Poland (22-23) → 8th place

Team Roster
 Edi Wickli
 Ernst Züllig
 Robert Jehle
 Roland Brand
 Max Schär
 Peter Maag
 Walter Müller
 Rudolf Weber
 Hans Huber
 Konrad Affolter
 Hanspeter Lutz
 Ugo Jametti
 Peter Jehle
 Martin Ott

Judo

Rowing

Sailing

Swimming

Men's 100m Freestyle
Stéfan Voléry
 Heats — 52,68 (→ did not advance)

Wrestling

References

Nations at the 1980 Summer Olympics
1980
1980 in Swiss sport